Independent Leaders is the debut studio album by American hip hop trio Naughty by Nature, released under the name The New Style in 1989 on MCA Records. Audio production of the record was handled mostly by the group.

Track listing

Personnel
Kier Lamont Gist - performer, producer
Anthony Shawn Criss - performer, producer
Vincent E. Brown - performer, producer
Denarius Hemphill - producer (track 9)
Swing - producer (track 3)
Ivan Rodriguez - mixing, engineering
David Darlington - mixing
Dwayne Sumal - engineering
Steve Hall - mastering
Hemu Aggarwal - art direction
Gene Crawford - photography

References

1989 debut albums
MCA Records albums
Naughty by Nature albums
Albums produced by KayGee